James Alexander Carse (born 13 December 1958) is a former Zimbabwean first class cricketer. He also played domestic cricket in England and South Africa. His son, Brydon Carse, currently plays for England in international cricket after making his debut in July 2021.

External links
Cricinfo profile

1958 births
Living people
Cricketers from Harare
Zimbabwean cricketers
Rhodesia cricketers
Griqualand West cricketers
Northamptonshire cricketers
Border cricketers
Eastern Province cricketers
Western Province cricketers